Hourui station is an elevated station on Line 1 of the Shenzhen Metro in Shenzhen, Guangdong Province, China. The station opened on 15 June 2011.

Passenger flights to and from Shenzhen Bao'an International Airport moved to the new Terminal 3 on 28 November 2013, and the old terminals A and B located by Airport East Station were closed. This station served the airport passenger traffic with a connecting bus to Terminal 3 until Airport Station opened.

Station layout

Exits

References

External links
 Shenzhen Metro Hourui Station (Chinese)
 Shenzhen Metro Hourui Station (English)

Railway stations in Guangdong
Shenzhen Metro stations
Bao'an District
Railway stations in China opened in 2011